Approximately 40% of primary energy (Heat and power) is from renewable energy sources in New Zealand. Approximately 80% of electricity comes from renewable energy, primarily hydropower and geothermal power.

Renewable energy by type

Renewable electricity

Renewable electricity in New Zealand is primarily from hydropower. In 2017, 82% of the electricity generated in New Zealand came from renewable sources. In September 2007, former Prime Minister Helen Clark announced a national target of 90 percent renewable electricity by 2025, with wind energy to make up much of that increase.

Solar power
Solar technologies in New Zealand only became affordable alternatives in the mid-2010s, compared to previous renewable offerings. The uptake in the residential and commercial market, though slow, has increased steadily. As with all renewable options, price of generation is key to the sustainability. It is only these recent changes in pricing that may see solar generation plants in the future.

Solar hot water

Installation of solar hot water heating systems is increasing in New Zealand due in part to government incentive schemes.

Bioenergy

According to the New Zealand Bioenergy Association, more than 10 percent of New Zealand's energy currently comes from bioenergy. Biodiesel, bioethanol and biomass (generally in the form of wood) are all used in New Zealand as a source of renewable energy.

Biomass 
New Zealand is rich in biomass from wood and waste which can be used as fuel. Biomass is sourced primarily from in-forest  and wood processing residues and municipal wood waste. This can be processed into pellets, chip or hog fuel.

Wood fuels are sustainable and carbon-neutral and can provide New Zealand with a greener economy, less dependent on fossil fuels.

New Zealand Ministry of Business, Innovation and Employment data  shows wood fuel is the cleanest energy consumed for industrial process heat by a large margin.

The Bioenergy Association of New Zealand has investigated the potential for greenhouse gas reduction brought about by switching from fossil fuel to wood biomass for industrial heat. It assessed that by 2050 New Zealand could more than double 2017 biomass energy supply, providing up to 27% of NZ's energy needs and realising a 15% reduction in greenhouse gas emissions.

Milk processing provides current examples of biomass use in industry:

 reducing coal use, through co-firing 
 replacing coal use

Biomass is also used for heating in hospitals, schools and universities.

Pumped Energy Storage 
When the water in lakes used for hydro-electricity runs low, coal and gas fired power stations have been used to make up the shortfall. In 2021 the Ardern government invested $11.5 million to investigate the feasibility of storing energy by pumping water to Lake Onslow in Central Otago. The lake could store up to 8 terawatt-hours of electricity or approximately one fifth of the country's consumption. The pumping would use power when it is plentiful and cheap, including wind power. Critics have argued that the scheme could upset the market by placing a cap on electricity prices.

See also 

 Energy in New Zealand
 Renewable energy commercialisation
 Solar power in New Zealand
 Wind power in New Zealand
 Ocean power in New Zealand
 Geothermal power in New Zealand
 Biofuel in New Zealand
 Hydroelectric power in New Zealand
 Solar hot water in New Zealand
 Renewable energy by country

References

External links 

Renewable energy at EECA
New Zealand to be carbon neutral by 2020